The Indiana University Health People Mover, formerly the Clarian Health People Mover, was a  long,  narrow gauge people mover in the city of Indianapolis in the United States. The system opened on June 28, 2003, to connect Methodist Hospital of Indianapolis, Indiana University Hospital, and  James Whitcomb Riley Hospital for Children, jointly operated as a single hospital by Indiana University Health.

The dual-track system was open to the public and operated around the clock, taking 5 minutes in each direction. During the daytime, a train departed automatically every six minutes. It was notable for being the only private transportation system in the United States constructed to run above public streets.

In December 2018, plans were introduced to revert the route to a bus-based operation after February 2019. The replacement road-based shuttle service would use four to six buses running on propane fuel or compressed natural gas, while the People Mover tracks would remain in place for the pneumatic tube system.

History
In 1997, the three hospital operations were combined under Indiana law creating a shared staff of over 10,000 employees who could be required to travel between the campuses. Commuting between the three sites was complicated and required crossing under Interstate 65 by shuttle buses.

In May 2000, a Health Care Transportation System Franchise Agreement was signed, followed by the People Mover – State of Indiana Airspace Agreement and Lease in November 2000 to allow crossing under the Interstate 65 highway for a period of 25 years. The system was ready by late 2002, which was followed by a six-month testing period, during which the trains were driven manually. After the public opening in June 2003, automatic and remote operation from the control center was used.

, the People Mover had made 500,000 round trips (1.04 million miles) and carried 6.1 million passengers, operating at 99.6-percent efficiency.

The People Mover carried its last passengers on Wednesday, February 6, 2019.

System

The system was constructed by Schwager Davis Inc. (SDI) from San Jose, California, to their Unitrak standard.

There are two separate parallel elevated guideways side-by-side, both of which operate in both directions. The concrete rails have a gap between them, designed to combat winter snow and the people mover is therefore not technically a monorail.

Each of the two tracks carried a train with three carriages for a total capacity of 81 passengers. The rest of the passenger capacity was made up of standing places.

Operation
During the night-time, one track was closed between 6:00 pm and 5:30 am for maintenance, with the other train/track operated in on-demand mode by elevator-style call buttons.

References

External links

 A trip report from April 2004, with photographs

2003 establishments in Indiana
2019 disestablishments in Indiana
Healthcare in Indianapolis
Hospital people mover systems
Indiana University
Narrow gauge railroads in Indiana
Former people mover systems in the United States
Railway lines opened in 2003
Transportation in Indianapolis
UniTrak people movers